A glass enclosure is an enclosure made mostly out of glass and may more specifically refer to:

 A container or cage such as a fish tank, terrarium, etc.
 A building, such as a greenhouse (or glasshouse), that may or may not have a curtain wall
 Display case
 Casing around an object, such as a light bulb, LED, fuse (electrical), vacuum tube, glass case in electronic packaging, etc. (and at the top of a lighthouse, a lantern, the Popemobile, etc.)

See also
 Glass (disambiguation)
 Enclosure (disambiguation)